This list covers songs which were one-hit wonders in Ireland by Irish artists only and achieved only one top 40 hit. Most of the one hit wonders in the UK and the United States were also one hit wonders in Ireland.

1960s
 "If I Didn't Have a Dime" - Tom Dunphy  
 "Black & Tan Gun" - The Johnny Flynn Showband with Pat Smith
 "The Black Velvet Band" - Johnny Kelly
 "Bucks Polka" - Clem Quinn and Miami Showband
 "Chance of a Lifetime - Pat McGeegan
 "The Wages of Love" - Muriel Day
 "Streets of Baltimore" - Des Kelly and the Capital Showband
 "Under Your Spell Again" - Savoy Showband

1970s
 "Three Leafed Shamrock" – John Kerr 
 "Things You Hear About Me" – Maxi, Dick and Twink
"Christmastime in Ireland" – Ann Bushnell
"The Floral Dance" – Terry Wogan
 "Viva II Papa" - Catrina Walsh
 "Welcome John Paul II" - Jim Tobin
 "(Shadow Play)" – Rory Gallagher

1980s
 "Horoscopes" – Sheeba
"It's a Sunday Morning" – Fuze
 "Here Today Gone Tomorrow" – The Duskeys
 "Business Enterprise (My Friend John)" – Those Nervous Animals
 "Show Some Concern" – The Concerned (Charity disc)
 "Feel It Now" – The Fountainhead
 "Waitign for a Miracle" by Mama's Boys
 "Green Boys" – Light a Big Fire
 "Town to Town" – Microdisney

1990s
"The By-road to Glenroe" by Mick Lally
"Give It a Lash Jack" by Liam Harrison & The GOAL Celebrities
"The Game" by The Memories
"Ooh Aah Paul McGrath" by Watch Your House
"Riverdance" by Bill Whelan
"Lumen" by Mícheál Ó Súilleabháin
"Nocturne" by Secret Garden
"The Voice" by Eimear Quinn
"The Only One" by Junkster
"She Moved Through the Fair" by Furry Village
"Goodbye Girl" by Shane O'Donoghue, 2FM Charity Single 1996.
"Aon Focal Eile" by Noel Furlong Family Group

2000s
"Who's in the House" – Fr. Brian and the Fun Lovin' Cardinals
"We're Really Saying Something" – Buffalo G
"May We Never Have to Say Goodbye" – Ronan Tynan and Rita Connolly
"Orange" – David O'Doherty
"The Langer" – Tim O'Riordan & Natural Gas
"On Wings" – Leanne Moore
"Merry Christmas Jakey Boy" – Jake Stevens
"Lay Me Down" – The Phases
"Make Her Cry" – The Marshals
"Shine" – Laura Izibor

2010s

"Beautiful Lies" - Roberta Howett
"Only Love Survives" – Ryan Dolan
"Roots" - Orla Gartland
"Heartbeat" – Can-linn featuring Kasey Smith
"Nothing's Gonna Stop Us Now" – JP Gilbourne
"Winter Song" – Twitterxmassingle 
"My Hero" – Presentation Secondary School Clonmel
"We All Stand Together" – Zog Chorus 
"High Hopes" – High Hopes Choir
"Silver Lining" – Aoife Parle

2020s

 "Pour The Milk" – Robbie Doherty & Keees 
 "Lately" – Chasing Abbey
 "Fake Fine" – Robert Grace
 "Plugged In Freestyle" – A92
 "Get Out My Head" – Shane Codd
 "IDK Why" – Lea Heart
 "I Don't Really Care About You" – CMAT
 "Talk About" – DJ Craig Gorman

Most recent one-hit wonder to be removed from the list: "All for You" by Cian Ducrot (November 2022)

Aggregate ensemble groups
The following is a list of aggregate ensemble groups. These are usually put together for charity purposes. The ones listed below are one-hit wonders in their respective line-ups, but most are primarily made up of Various Artists.

 Various Artists – "Tiny Dancer A Song for Lily Mae" (2012) 
 Various Artists – "The Rocky Road to Poland" (2012)
 Various Artists – "The Ballad of Ronnie Drew" (2008) 
 Various Artists – "Candle for Kosovo" (1999)

See also
Lists of one-hit wonders
Music of Ireland

References

Irish music-related lists
Ireland